Derek Ryan may refer to:

Derek Ryan (ice hockey) (born 1986), American ice hockey player
Derek Ryan (squash player) (born 1969), Republic of Ireland squash player
Derek Ryan (singer), Irish country singer, also formerly of Irish band D-Side